Cynorkis gibbosa is an orchid species in the genus Cynorkis, endemic to forest edges and shaded rocks at altitudes of 600–1500 meters in Madagascar. Its flowers are salmon-pink or red, and about 35 mm in length.
Found in Madagascar on shady granite rocks, on steep banks, seepage areas, along streams and at forest edges at elevations of 600 to 2000 meters as a small to medium-sized, warm to cool growing terrestrial herb with several elongated, villous tubers giving rise to a solitary, radical, oblong-lanceolate, purple maculate leaf that is shortly attenuate at both ends and amplexiculate basally that blooms in the mid spring through fall on a bristly granular, sometimes glabrous, densely many [10 to 40] flowered, subcorymbiform inflorescence carrying 2 to 3 distant, cauline sheaths and having 10 mostly simultaneous flowers at any one time.

References

 J. Linn. Soc., Bot. 20: 331 1883.
 The Plant List
 Encyclopedia of Life
 eFloras Madagascar Catalogue
 The New Encyclopedia of Orchids: 1500 Species in Cultivation, I. F. La Croix, Timber Press, 2008, page 132. .

Orchideae